Statistics of League of Ireland in the 1959/1960 season.

Overview
It was contested by 12 teams, and Limerick won the championship and qualified to play in the European Cup for following season 1960/61.

Final classification

Results

Top scorers

Ireland
League of Ireland seasons
1959–60 in Republic of Ireland association football